Two submarines of the Turkish Navy have borne the name and pennant number TCG Pirireis (S 343), both were former US Navy vessels:

  , transferred on loan under the Military Assistance Program to Turkey on 18 March 1960. Sold outright to Turkey, 1 August 1973. Disposed of in 1973.
  , leased to Turkey on 8 February 1980, sold on 6 August 1987, and decommissioned in August 2004.

Turkish Navy ship names